Another Country may refer to:

Films 
 Another Country (1984 film), an adaptation of Mitchell's play
 Another Country (2015 film), a documentary about the intersection of Australian Aboriginal culture and modern Australian culture

Literature 
 Another Country (novel), 1962, by American writer James Baldwin
 Another Country (play), 1981, by English playwright Julian Mitchell

Music 
 Another Country (The Chieftains album), 1992
 Another Country (Mango Groove album), 1993 album by South African music group Mango Groove
 "Another Country" (Mango Groove song), title song of the 1993 album by Mango Groove
 Another Country (Tift Merritt album), 2008
 Another Country (Cassandra Wilson album), 2012
 Another Country (Rod Stewart album), 2015
 "Another Country", a 1986 song by Redgum on their album Midnight Sun

Most of the above derive, at least indirectly, from the second stanza of I Vow to Thee, My Country, a hymn by Cecil Spring Rice, set to music by Gustav Holst.

See also
The Past is Another Country (disambiguation)